In Silence is a 2014 Czech-Slovak biographical film written and directed by . The film, which deals with the issue of Jewish musicians in the 1930s, was partially funded on Kickstarter. It received a nomination for the Czech Lion Award for Best Film Poster at the 2014 ceremony, but the award went to Fair Play.

Plot

Cast

References

External links 

2014 films
Czech biographical drama films
Slovak drama films
Films directed by Zdeněk Jiráský
Czech biographical films
Kickstarter-funded films
2010s biographical films